Several German racing drivers have been nicknamed the Regenmeister (rain master) for their prowess in wet conditions:

 Rudolf Caracciola (1901–1959)
 Hans-Joachim Stuck (1951– )
 Michael Schumacher (1969– )
 Sebastian Vettel (1987– )